Ajip Rosidi (31 January 1938 – 29 July 2020) was an Indonesian poet and short story writer. As of 1983 he had published 326 works in 22 different magazines.

Biography
Rosidi was born on 31 January 1938, in Jatiwangi, Majalengka, West Java. He attended the School of the People, Jatiwangi, in 1950; District VIII Junior High School Jakarta in 1953; and Taman Madya High School, Taman.Siswa Jakarta in 1956. He began his literary career at the age of fourteen years. Since 1952, his works began to appear in magazines such as "Indonesia", "Indonesia Pulpit", "Arena/Ploy", "Confrontation" and "Zenith Platform".

As a child, he read numerous translated works in both Indonesian and Sundanese. He is also known as Sundanese Poet. After reading a guide to writing, Rosidi began writing poems and short stories. His first short story was published in the children's section of Indonesia Raya when he was 12. By the age of 15, his work was being published in local magazines. He was paid between Rp 25 and Rp 125 per piece, a considerable amount of money then. Two years later, he released his first collection of short stories, published under the title Tahun-tahun Kematian (Years of Death). He subsequently dropped out of high school to focus on writing. At age 17, he attended African American author Richard Wright's lecture "Seniman dan Masaalahnja" (The Artist and His Problems) at the Balai Budaja in Jakarta.

Rosidi's works have been translated into many foreign languages, published in anthologies or as a book, in Dutch, Chinese, English, Japanese. He has also translated many biographies. He served as editor of numerous magazines, including Suluh Pelajar (Student Torch) from 1953 to 1955, and Prosa in 1955. In 1962, together with writer Ramadhan KH, Harris Obon, and Tatang Suryaatmadja, he founded the Publisher Kiwari. From 1964 to 1970 he served as the director of the publishing house Tjupumanik, along with the publishers Duta Rakyat from 1965 to 1968 and Dunia Pustaka Jaya from 1971 to 1979. During the years 1965–67, he became the founder and chief editor of "Weekly Sundanese", later referred to as "Madjalah Sundanese", which was published in Bandung. In 1968 he proposed Ali Sadikin, the then governor of Jakarta, to form the Jakarta Arts Council (DKJ), in which he served as the chairman for three consecutive periods from 1972 to 1981. Meanwhile, during the years 1966 to 1975, he also served as the head of the Association of Sundanese Writers. In 1971, he led the National Library Publisher Jaya (Jaya Raya Foundation). In 1973, Congress IKAPI chose Rosidi as the chairman of the agency. For the period 1976–79, he was re-elected for the same.

In 1981, Rosidi served as Guest Lecturer of Indonesian language and literature at the Osaka University of Foreign Studies (Gaikokugo Daikagu Osaka) in Osaka, Japan, Professor Extraordinary at the Tenri Daigaku, Nara from 1983 to 1994, and Kyoto Sangyo Daigaku, Kyoto from 1983 to 1996. While in Japan he also taught at the Asahi Cultural Center.  In 2003, he retired and returned to Indonesia. In 2004, he became the general manager of Sundanese-language monthly magazine, Cupumanik.

On 31 January 2008 Rosidi released his autobiography, Hidup Tanpa Ijasah (Living Without a Diploma). The launching ceremony was held at Padjadjaran University. On 31 January 2011, he was awarded a Doctorate Honoris Causa from the field of Cultural Studies, Faculty of Letters, University of Padjadjaran. As of 2008, Rosidi resided in Pabelan, Magelang.

Activism
Rosidi worked to preserve Sundanese culture as well as other cultures of Indonesia, promoted the continued use of local languages and awarded the Rancage Literary Award to works in Sundanese; he provided two other awards for works in Javanese and Balinese. He founded and led the research project and folklore Pantun Sundanese (PPP-FS), during the period 1970–1973. In 2000 he wrote Encyclopedia: Encyclopedia of Culture Sundanese. He encouraged research on ancient Sundanese manuscripts. He asserted that from about 200 ancient Sundanese manuscripts found so far, only about 23 scripts can be read. Rosidi expressed reservations regarding what he viewed as the commercialization of culture, citing the existence of Indonesia's Ministry of Culture and Tourism as proof that culture is being sold.

Bibliography

References

External links
Ajip Rosidi on Kompas-Gramedia.

Profile of Ajip Rosidi at The Jakarta Post

Indonesian writers
1938 births
2020 deaths
20th-century Indonesian poets
Academic staff of Osaka University
Sundanese people
21st-century Indonesian poets
Indonesian male poets
20th-century male writers
21st-century male writers
People from Majalengka Regency